A Diplomatic Mission is a 1918 American silent comedy-drama film directed by Jack Conway and starring Earle Williams, Grace Darmond and Leslie Stuart.

Cast
 Earle Williams as Sylvester Todd 
 Grace Darmond as Lady Diana Loring 
 Leslie Stuart as Sir John Boyden 
 Kathleen Kirkham as Lady Boyden 
 J. Gordon Russell as Von Goetz

References

Bibliography
 James Robert Parish & Michael R. Pitts. Film directors: a guide to their American films. Scarecrow Press, 1974.

External links
 

1918 films
1918 drama films
1910s English-language films
American silent feature films
Films directed by Jack Conway
American black-and-white films
Vitagraph Studios films
1910s American films
Silent American comedy-drama films